Jeffrey Williams (born 18 August 1958) is an English former professional road racing cyclist from Manchester. He rode for Great Britain at the Olympic Games, and won several national championship titles.

Cycling career
In 1979 Williams won his first British National Hill Climb Championships setting a new course record that still stands to this day. A rival, Andy Hitchens, who remembers it well, said: "Williams looked like he'd been on starvation rations for months — he was built like a sparrow. Some people assume that there was a howling tailwind that day, but there wasn't. It was sunny, but cool.” In 1980 Williams joined the Manchester Wheelers' Club and was expected to win International honours during the next two or three seasons. Later that year he won his first stage in the Sealink International finishing four minutes clear. However Williams was left disappointed in the National Hill Climb Championships that year beaten into second place by Malcolm Elliott by only one fifth of a second after being knocked off his bike whilst warming up and receiving a broken nose and severe bruising. At the age of 21 Williams competed for Great Britain in the individual road race at the 1980 Moscow Olympic Games. He was sponsored by Harry Hall Cycles. Williams finished 47th, alongside Stephen Roche. At the end of the 1980 season Williams publicly declared his intention of living and racing in France for the 1981 racing calendar with a view to turning professional therefore joining the French club ACBB (Athletic Club de Boulogne Billencourt), Europe's most successful sports club.

In 1982 Williams completed a unique double, of the British Road Race Championship and Hill Climb Championship becoming the first person ever to do so in the same season. Williams competed in the individual road race at the 1982 Commonwealth Games in Brisbane.

In 1986 he joined Raleigh riding with Paul Sherwen, Mark Bell, Paul Watson and Jon Clay. Williams retired at the end of the 1987 season. He was famed for his hill climbing ability and considered by many to be one of the most exciting riders, he scaled the heights throughout his career, but also plumbed the depths.

Trivia 
Williams starred in the intro for the Channel 4 coverage of the Tour de France throughout the late 80s to mid 90s (see video ). The music was composed by Pete Shelley of the Buzzcocks.

Family Links
Jeff was brother-in-law to fellow Olympic cyclist Peter Longbottom (13 May 1959 – 10 February 1998). He is also the younger brother of Mike Williams a former professional rider.

Palmarès 
1979
 1st Tour of the Peaks
 2nd Archer Grand Prix
  2nd Overall, Premier Calendar
  1st British National Hill Climb Championships
1980
  1st stage 5, Sealink International
  1st Archer Grand Prix
 1st Tour of the Peaks
  1st Tour of the Pennines (pro-am)
  1st stage 2, Yorkshire Classic (Harrogate)
  2nd British National Hill Climb Championships
  47th Olympic Games, Road race
1981
  1st Porthole Grand Prix
  2nd Grand Prix de la Ville de Lillers
  2nd Paris – Ezy
 2nd Tour of the Peaks
  1st stage 2, Sealink International
  1st British National Hill Climb Championships
1982
 4th Overall, Circuit des Ardennes
 4th Overall, Sealink International
 1st stage 5, Sealink International
  Winner of the British National Road Race Championships (Amateur)
 2nd Archer Grand Prix
 2nd Overall, Premier Calendar
 16th Commonwealth Games, Road race
 1st British National Hill Climb Championships
1983
  2nd Hanley
  6th Tour of the Cotswolds
1984
  15th Overall, Milk Race
1985
  2nd British National Road Race Championships (Amateur)
1986
  3rd Wrekin
  12th Overall, Milk Race
  60th Overall, Nissan Classic
1987
  1st Newby

References

External links 

1958 births
Living people
English male cyclists
Commonwealth Games competitors for England
Olympic cyclists of Great Britain
Cyclists at the 1980 Summer Olympics
Cyclists at the 1982 Commonwealth Games
British cycling road race champions
Sportspeople from Manchester
People from Gorton